The Heavenly Idol is an ongoing South Korean television series starring Kim Min-kyu, Go Bo-gyeol, and Lee Jang-woo. Based on the web novel of the same name by Shin Hwa-jin, it premiered on tvN on February 15, 2023, and airs every Wednesday and Thursday at 22:30 (KST). It is also available for streaming on Viki and Viu in selected regions.

Synopsis
In the supernatural Other World, the Pontifex Rembrary and his troops battle against dark forces in a campaign to thwart the Evil One's return to power after a hundred years. Just as he takes the upper hand in a tough duel against the Evil One, an inexplicable force foils Rembrary's victory and transports him to the present world. He finds himself in the body of a K-pop idol named Woo Yeon-woo, a member of the boy group Wild Animal. The true Yeon-woo has been transported to the Other World in Rembrary's body. Naive of the workings of the present world, Rembrary struggles to live as a K-pop idol while finding a way to return to the Other World in order to restore himself and Yeon-woo to their original bodies and save the two worlds from the Evil One.

Cast

Main
 Kim Min-kyu as Rembrary / Woo Yeon-woo
 Rembrary: a Pontifex (Daesin-gwan) from the Other World who is suddenly transported to the present world, waking up in the body of the K-pop idol Woo Yeon-woo. The 23rd Pontifex serving the deity Redrin, Rembrary is known for his dashing looks, strong morality and his compassion for the people of the Other World. He posseses divine powers that he uses in fighting against dark forces. While battling against the Evil One, he is inexplicably transported to the present world and finds himself in Yeon-woo's body. He then struggles to live as a K-pop idol while finding a way to return to the Other World and save the people from the Evil One's potential return to power.
 Woo Yeon-woo: the main rapper and sub-vocalist of the K-pop boy group Wild Animal under LLL Entertainment. After originally auditioning as an aspiring actor, Yeon-woo debuted five years ago as a K-pop idol at the recommendation of the CEO who admired his handsome looks. Whilst being an idol, he did not give up on his dream to become an actor. Minutes before a live music show broadcast, he is suddenly transported to the Other World and finds himself in Rembrary's body.
 Go Bo-gyeol as Kim Dal
Wild Animal's new manager and a big fan of Woo Yeon-woo. Dal is a former girl group manager who slumped into depression after one of the group's members committed suicide. Finding new hope from fangirling for Woo Yeon-woo, she ultimately decides to apply as Wild Animal's new manager and help them attain stardom. Unbelieving at first, she later becomes one of the very few people aware of Rembrary's true identity.
 Lee Jang-woo as the Evil One (Mawang) / Shin Jo-woon
The King of Evil of the Other World and Redrin's archenemy. After a hundred years of dormancy, the Evil One threatens to regain supreme power over the Other World. He pursues Rembrary across dimensions and manifests himself in the present world as Shin Jo-woon, the vice chairman of RU E&M, an entertainment company. He uses his black magic to trigger or aggravate his victim's inner evils and darkness to turn them into his minions against their will.

Supporting

People in the LLL Entertainment
 Ye Ji-won as Im Sun-ja
CEO of LLL Entertainment which is the agency of the group Wild Animal.
 Hong Seung-beom as Choi Jeong-seo
The leader and sub-rapper of Wild Animal.
 Shin Myung-seung as Hwang Tae-in
The main vocalist of Wild Animal.
 Choi Jae-hyun as Kasy
The lead vocalist of Wild Animal.
 Shin Kyu-hyeon as Cha Hae-gyeol
The youngest member and main dancer of Wild Animal.

People in the Entertainment Industry
 Tak Jae-hoon as Sun Woo-sil
A senior artist who hates Woo Yeon-woo.
 Lee Dal as Kim Moo-rok
An entertainment PD who is called the god of survival entertainment.
 Oh Jin-seok as Oh Jung-shin
The youngest member of the boy group AX.
 Kim Seo-ha as Maeng Woo-shin
A famous actor who is a member of a secretive all-celebrity religious cult called Hongwoodaedae.

Members of Evil Boys 
Evil Boys is a K-pop boy group whose members turned into malevolent yogoe (goblin). Once a struggling group like Wild Animals, the band unknowingly bargained their souls with Hongwoodaedae's leader in return for their success and popularity, but the deal caused their gradual transformation into yogoe.
 Jung Su-hyeon as Raken
The leader of the boy group Evil Boys and a fully transformed yogoe.
 Wonjun as Typhon
The youngest member of Evil Boys. Gradually transforming into a yogoe, Typhon has become terrified of what the group has become.
 Lee Woo-tae as Vasily
The main dancer of the Evil Boys.

Beings in the Afterlife
 Jang Young-nam as Yeomra
The present world's deity of the afterlife who rules and oversees the fate of humans.
 Park Sang-nam as Sa Gam-jae / Grim Reaper
Wild Animal's new road manager who is a grim reaper to watch over Woo Yeon-woo.

Beings from the Other World
 Cha Joo-young as Redrin  
The deity who is the creator of the Other World. Redrin appears like a young adult woman and keeps the boundary between the underworld and the present world.

Others
 Baek Seo-bin as Chief Jang
 Ryu Seung-moo as a hwansin
a mysterious being who is targeting Rembrary for another purpose while serving the Evil One. Existing in both present world and the Other World, a hwansin is a former human who lost his or her physical body after contracting a deal with an evil being.

Special appearances
 Nature as the popular girl group Queen Crush
 E'Last
 Ahn Se-ha as Wild Animal's ex-manager
 Lee Sun-bin as acting trainer

Episodes

Original soundtrack

Part 1

Part 2

Part 3

Viewership

Notes

References

External links
  
 
 
  at Viki

TVN (South Korean TV channel) television dramas
Korean-language television shows
2023 South Korean television series debuts
Television series by Studio Dragon
South Korean fantasy television series
South Korean musical television series
South Korean romance television series
Television shows based on South Korean webtoons